(from Latin: "The Roman Pontiff") are papal bulls issued in 1436 by Pope Eugenius IV and in 1455 by Pope Nicholas V praising Catholic King Afonso V of Portugal for his battles against the Muslims, endorsing his military expeditions into Western Africa and instructing him to capture and subdue all Saracens, Turks, and other non-Christians to reduce their persons to perpetual slavery. The Church leaders argued that slavery served as a natural deterrent and Christianizing influence to “barbarous” behavior among pagans.  As a follow-up to the bull , the church leaders now took positions aside the Crown of Portugal that it was entitled to dominion over all lands south of Cape Bojador in Africa. The bull's primary purpose was to forbid other Christian kings from infringing the King of Portugal's practice of trade and colonisation in these regions, particularly amid the Portuguese and Castilian competition for ascendancy over new lands discovered.

This bull should not be confused with a 21 September 1451 bull by the same name, also written by Nicholas V, relieving the dukes of Austria from any potential ecclesiastical censure for permitting Jews to dwell there.

Background

Around 1312 Genoese navigator Lancelotto Malocello came upon the Canary Islands. The Portuguese travelled there in 1341 both to trade and raid. By 1346 slave raiding was occurring. However, the first attempt at permanent colonization was sponsored by the Castilians in 1402. During the 14th century, a variety of forces competed for control of the Canaries: Genoese, Catalan-Mallorcan, Castilian, and Portuguese. In the following century, Castile and Portugal were the primary contenders.

In the early 15th century the Portuguese searched for a sea route to India to participate in the spice trade. As a first step, Prince Henry the Navigator launched expeditions to explore the West Coast of Africa. This experience exerted a deep impression so that his reign later on was marked by an ambitious expansion that resulted in exploratory achievements. It led, however, to disputes between the Portuguese and the Castilians regarding control along the African coast. As an independent third party, the pope would, on occasion, be asked to arbitrate disputes between kingdoms.  On January 5, 1443, in the papal bull Rex regum, Eugenius IV had taken a neutral position on the disputed claims of Castile and Portugal over territory in Africa.

History
 
It was not until Afonso V of Portugal responded to a papal call for aid against the Turks, who eventually seized Constantinople in 1453, that Pope Nicholas V supported the Portuguese claims in the bull Dum Diversas.

Nonetheless, in 1454 a fleet of caravels from Seville and Cadiz traded along the African coast and upon their return were intercepted by a Portuguese squadron. One of the ships was captured with crew and cargo taken to Portugal. Enrique IV of Castile threatened war. Afonso V appealed to the pope for moral support of Portugal's right to a monopoly of trade in lands she discovered.

The bull, issued in January 1455, endorsed Portuguese possession of Ceuta (which they already held) and the exclusive right to trade, navigation, and fishing in the discovered lands. It provided an exemption from a canon law prohibition on trading with infidels.

Content
The bull praises earlier Portuguese victories against the Muslims of North Africa and the success of expeditions of discovery and conquest to the Azores and to Africa south of Cape Bojador. It also repeats earlier injunctions not to supply items useful in war such as weaponry, iron or timber to either Muslims or non-Christians. In Dum Diversas, the European trade with Muslims was strictly prohibited but Romanus Pontifex gave the King of Portugal an exception, provided that the trade did not include iron, weapons, and wood for building. Overall, there were the threats of ecclesiastical punishments, including excommunication and interdiction, for those who violate the provisions of the papal grant.

The substance of the Bull's articles are as follows:

Effect
King Afonso V gave a ceremonial lecture on the bull in Lisbon Cathedral on October 5, 1455, to inform the foreign representatives of commerce. With the bull the Portuguese had a monopoly for trade in the new areas in Africa and Asia. It also served as the legal basis for boarding foreign ships in that area. Historian Stephen Bown notes that, "... Prince Henry and King Afonso V had now also shrouded Portuguese commercial activities in a cloak of pious devotion to the church's work". Along with the right of conquest, Romanus Pontifex effectively made the Portuguese king and his representatives the church's direct agents of ecclesiastical administration and expansion. The Portuguese authorities sent to colonise lands were not only commanded to build churches, monasteries, and holy places, but also authorized to ...send over to them any ecclesiastical persons whatsoever, as volunteers, both seculars, and regulars of any of the mendicant orders (with license, however, from their superiors), and that those persons may abide there as long as they shall live, and hear confessions of all who live in the said parts or who come thither, and after the confessions have been heard they may give due absolution in all cases, except those reserved to the aforesaid see, and enjoin salutary penance, and also administer the ecclesiastical sacraments freely and lawfully.... . This authority to appoint missioners was granted to Afonso and his successors.

Colonialism

In 1493 Pope Alexander VI issued the bull Inter caetera stating one Christian nation did not have the right to establish dominion over lands previously dominated by another Christian nation. Together, the bulls Dum Diversas and Romanus Pontifex, along with Inter Caetera, have been interpreted as serving as a justification for the Age of Imperialism. They were also early influences on the development of the slave trade of the 15th and 16th centuries, even though the papal bull Sublimis Deus of 1537 forbade the enslavement of non-Christians. The executive brief for Sublimis Deus was withdrawn by the Pope after protests by the Spanish monarchy. Pope Paul III publicly sanctioned slavery in Rome in 1545, the enslavement of Englishmen who supported Henry VIII after he had been excommunicated, and the purchase of Muslim slaves in 1548.

Norman Housley observes that "it would be unfair to criticize the papal court exclusively for its failure to be more discriminating in its grants or to take more frequently the kind of action which Eugenius IV adopted in 1454 over the Canaries." The idea of discovery, and the conversion and enslavement that accompanied it, were identified with hard-held concepts of crusade and chivalry at that time.

United States

In the 1823 case Johnson v. M'Intosh Chief Justice John Marshall found in favor of a "universal recognition" of a so-called discovery doctrine that held that discovery gave title to the government by whose subjects, or by whose authority, it was made, against all other European governments, which title might be consummated by possession.

Spain did not rest her title solely on the grant of the Pope. Her discussions respecting boundary, with France, with Great Britain, and with the United States, all show that she placed it on the rights given by discovery. Portugal sustained her claim to the Brazils by the same title.

Most of the opinion is dicta; thus, all that the opinion holds with respect to aboriginal title is that it is inalienable, a principle that remains well-established law in nearly all common law jurisdictions.

This decision was upheld in the 1831 case Cherokee Nation v. Georgia, giving Georgia authority to extend state laws over Cherokees within the state, and famously describing Native American tribes as "domestic dependent nations". This decision was modified in Worcester v. Georgia, which stated that the U.S. federal government, and not individual states, had authority in Indian affairs, but it maintained the loss of right to title upon discovery by Europeans.

In recent years, Native American groups including the Taíno and Onondaga have called on the Vatican to revoke the bulls of 1452, 1455, and 1493. The Haudenosaunee countered the papal bulls with the Two Row Wampum conditionally accepting the bulls, stating through the two row wampum: "You say that you are our Father and I am your Son. We will not be like Father and Son, but like Brothers. This wampum belt confirms our words....Neither of us will make compulsory laws or interfere in the internal affairs of the other. Neither of us will try to steer the other's vessel."

Mission
After Vasco da Gama found the sea route to India in 1498, the Portuguese practiced trading for four centuries. Portuguese clerics were only responsible for the needs of the Portuguese, and clerics of other nations were not allowed to operate in Portuguese India.

In Goa, envoys of the Pope were arrested and sent back to Portugal.

See also
 Conquest of the Canary Islands
 Creator Omnium
 Catholic Church and the Age of Discovery

References

Bibliography

Panzer, Joel S. The Popes and Slavery, New York : Alba House, 1996.   Review

1454 in Europe
Native American law
1454 works
15th-century papal bulls
Documents of Pope Nicholas V
1450s in Portugal

fr:Romanus pontifex (1776)